Inuktitut syllabics (or) is an abugida-type writing system used in Canada by the Inuktitut-speaking Inuit of the territory of Nunavut and the Nunavik and Nunatsiavut regions of Quebec and Labrador, respectively. In 1976, the Language Commission of the Inuit Cultural Institute made it the co-official script for the Inuit languages, along with the Latin script.

The name   derives from the root , meaning "mouth".

History
The first efforts to write Inuktitut came from Moravian missionaries in Greenland and Labrador in the mid-19th century using Latin script. The first book printed in Inuktitut using Cree script was an 8-page pamphlet known as Selections from the Gospels in the dialect of the Inuit of Little Whale River ("Jesus' words"), printed by John Horden in 1855–56 at Moose Factory for Edwin Arthur Watkins to use among the Inuit at Fort George. In November 1865, Horden and Watkins met in London under Henry Venn's direction to adapt Cree syllabics to the Inuktitut language. In the 1870s, Edmund Peck, another Anglican missionary, started printing according to that standard. Other missionaries, and later linguists in the employ of the Canadian and American governments, adapted the Latin alphabet to the dialects of the Mackenzie River delta, the western Arctic islands and Alaska.

Inuktitut is one variation on Canadian Aboriginal syllabics, and can be digitally encoded using the Unicode standard.  The Unicode block for Inuktitut characters is called Unified Canadian Aboriginal Syllabics.

The consonant in the syllable can be g, j, k, l, m, n, p, q, r, s, t, v, ng, ł, or absent, and the vowel can be a, i, u, ai (now only in Nunavik), or absent.

Table
The Inuktitut script is commonly presented as a syllabary. The dots on the letters in the table mark long vowels; in the Latin transcription, the vowel is doubled. For geminate consonants, the final consonant symbol is placed before the CV syllabic, for instance -kku-, -nnu- are rendered ᒃᑯ and ᓐᓄ respectively.

Note: An image of the chart is also available.

Modifications
The Makivik Corporation expanded the official version of the script to restore the ai-pai-tai column. The common diphthong ai has generally been represented by combining the a form with a stand-alone letter ᐃ i. This fourth-vowel variant had been removed so that Inuktitut could be typed and printed using IBM Selectric balls in the 1970s. The reinstatement was justified on the grounds that modern printing and typesetting equipment no longer suffers the restrictions of earlier typewriting machinery. The ai-pai-tai column is used only in Nunavik.

See also
 Inuit phonology
 Inuktitut Braille

References

Further reading

 Balt, Peter. Inuktitut Affixes. Rankin Inlet? N.W.T.: s.n, 1978.

External links
Interactive syllabic chart with sound: https://tusaalanga.ca/pronunciation
Inuktitut script at Omniglot
Inuktitut syllabics at Languagegeek
 Inuktitut Roman-Syllabics, Syllabics-Roman transliteration
Canadian Native Languages (Version 1.2)

Canadian Aboriginal syllabics
Inuktitut
Inuit languages
1855 introductions